The 2017–18 First Division was the 28th season of Norway's second highest ice hockey league, First Division.

The regular season began play on September 23, 2017, and was concluded on February 28, 2018.

The playoffs began March 2018.

Participating teams

Team changes
Bergen went bankrupt in July 2017. The team was not replaced. 
 Tønsberg was promoted through the 2016-17 playoffs. Moss was relegated.

Regular season

Standings
Updated as of February 28, 2018.
x – clinched promotional playoff spot; y – clinched regular season league title; r – play in relegation series

Source: hockey.no

Playoffs

Promotional Playoffs

After the regular season had ended, the two lowest ranked teams in the 2017–18 GET-ligaen and the two highest ranked teams in the First Division competed for the right to play in the 2018–19 GET-ligaen. The tournament was organized according to a double round robin format, where each club played the others twice, home and away, for a total of six games. The points system and ranking method used, was the same as in the regular season.

Standings
Updated as of March 22, 2018.

q – qualified for next years GET-league; r – will play in next years 1. division

Source: hockey.no

Relegational Playoffs

After the regular season ended, the lowest ranked team in the First Division and the two highest ranked teams in the Second Division competed for the right to play in the 2018–19 Norwegian First Division. The tournament is organized to be played over one weekend, where each club played the others once, for a total of three games. The points system and ranking method used was the same as in the regular season.

Standings
Updated as of March 22, 2018.

q – qualified for next years 1. division; r – will play in next years 2. division

Source: hockey.no

References

External links
  

Norw
First Division
Norwegian First Division (ice hockey) seasons